Charles Schreyvogel (January 4, 1861 – January 27, 1912) was an American painter of Western subject matter in the days of the disappearing frontier. Schreyvogel was especially interested in military life.

Life 

He was born in Hoboken, New Jersey to Paul and Theresa Schreyvogel, and grew up in a poor family of German immigrant shopkeepers on the Lower East Side of New York.Schreyvogel was unable to afford art classes and he taught himself to draw. In 1901, his painting My Bunkie  was awarded the Thomas Clarke Prize at the annual exhibition of the National Academy of Design. He suddenly became recognized and earned what seemed like overnight fame.

Schreyvogel did much of his work in his studio (or its rooftop) in decidedly non-Western Hoboken.

He died in Hoboken in 1912 and is buried in Flower Hill Cemetery, North Bergen, New Jersey.

Works by Schreyvogel are included in the collections of the National Cowboy & Western Heritage Museum, Oklahoma City, Oklahoma, the Sid Richardson Museum, Fort Worth, Texas, the Metropolitan Museum of Art, and the Gilcrease Museum, Tulsa, Oklahoma.

See also

 Charles Marion Russell, western artist
 J. K. Ralston, western artist
 Frederic Remington, western artist

Notes
 James D. Horan. The Life And Art Of Charles Schreyvogel: Painter-Historian Of The Indian-Fighting Army Of The American West. New York: Crown Publishers Inc., 1969.
 Rick Stewart. The American West: Legendary Artists of the Frontier. Hawthorne Publishing Company, 1986.

References

External links
 
Charles (or Carl) Schreyvogel (1861-1912)
Attack on the Herd, ca.1907, Sid Richardson Museum, includes biography

1861 births
1912 deaths
American people of German descent
19th-century American painters
American male painters
20th-century American painters
Artists from Hoboken, New Jersey
Painters from New York City
19th-century American male artists
20th-century American male artists
Burials at Flower Hill Cemetery (North Bergen, New Jersey)